Agathia solaria is a species of moth of the family Geometridae first described by Charles Swinhoe in 1905. It is found in the Himalayas, Singapore and possibly Sulawesi.

References

Geometrinae
Moths of Asia